Brigadier Daniel Aston Luxton,  (22 June 1891 – 1960) was an Australian Army officer in the First and Second World Wars.

Military career
Luxton served in the Australian Imperial Force in the 5th Battalion. Luxton embarked from Melbourne as a lieutenant on 21 October 1914. After being repeatedly promoted over the course of the war, Luxton was appointed the commanding officer of the 5th Battalion on 8 March 1917. During his wartime service, Luxton was appointed a Companion of the Order of St Michael and St George, and awarded the Distinguished Service Order.

During the Second World War, Luxton served as a brigadier in the Second Australian Imperial Force.

References

1891 births
1960 deaths
Australian brigadiers
Australian Companions of the Distinguished Service Order
Australian Companions of the Order of St Michael and St George
Australian military personnel of World War I
Australian Army personnel of World War II
Military personnel from Melbourne
People from Camberwell, Victoria